Chiren may refer to:
 Chiren (Nostradamus), a person who appears in the predictions of Nostradamus
 Chiren (village), a village located in northwestern Bulgaria